The Caproni Vizzola F.5 was an Italian fighter aircraft that was built by Caproni. It was a single-seat, low-wing cantilever monoplane with retractable landing gear.

Development

The F.5 was developed in parallel with the Caproni Vizzola F.4, with which it shared a common airframe. Design began in late 1937 by a team led by F. Fabrizi. The aircraft had a welded steel-tube fuselage and wooden wings; the fuselage was covered with flush-riveted duralumin, while the wing had a stressed plywood skin. The F.5 (standing for Fabrizi 5) had a two-row 14-cylinder Fiat A.74 R.C. 38 radial engine, unlike its cousin the F.4, which Fabrizi and his design team intended to be powered by a water-cooled engine. The F.4 project was not pursued immediately because the Italian Air Ministry held its proposed engine in disfavor, but development of the F.5 continued.

The F.5 prototype first flew on 19 February 1939. The aircraft displayed very high maneuverability during official testing, prompting an order for both a second prototype and 12 preproduction models. The last of the preproduction aircraft was selected for use as a prototype in a renewed F.4 program, but the rest of the F.5 order was delivered to the Regia Aeronautica (Italian Royal Air Force).

No F.5 production models were built as Caproni decided to produce the more developed Caproni Vizzola F.6M fighter instead.

Operational history

The Regia Aeronautica assigned the 11 preproduction F.5 fighters to the 300° Squadriglia, 51° Stormo for operational use. By 1942, they were serving as night fighters in the 167° Gruppo.

The F.5 was offered to foreign customers. It has been said that the Aeroplani Caproni subsidiary in Peru acquired the license rights for local manufacture, but no F.5s were ever built in Peru.

Variants
F.5
Prototype and preproduction aircraft, powered by a Fiat A.74 R.C. 38 radial engine, 13 built, plus a 14th airframe which was completed as the Caproni Vizzola F.4.
F.5bisOne re-engined F.5, powered with an 1175 h.p. Alfa Romeo R.A.I000 R.C.44-la Monsonie (Monsoon) (license-built DB 601A-l) engine.
F.5 Gamma
A one- or two-seat advanced trainer powered by a 540 h.p. Isotta Fraschini Gamma R.C.35 IS alr-cooled engine, armed with one 7.7-mm. Breda-SAFAT machine gun, with an estimated maximum speed of 254 m.p.h. Not proceeded with.

Operators

Regia Aeronautica

Specifications (F.5)

See also

Notes

References

 

Green, William, and Gordon Swanborough. The Complete Book of Fighters: An Illustrated Encyclopedia of Every Fighter Aircraft Built and Flown. New York: SMITHMARK Publishers, 1994. .

Vizzola F.5
Low-wing aircraft
World War II Italian fighter aircraft
1930s Italian fighter aircraft
Single-engined tractor aircraft
Aircraft first flown in 1939